Dragon Lee may refer to:
 Dragon Lee (actor) (born 1958), South Korean-Hong Kong actor and martial artist
 Dragon Lee (wrestler) (born 1995), Mexican masked professional wrestler
 Dralístico (born 1991), Mexican masked professional wrestler, who originally worked under the ring name Dragon Lee